is a Ryukyuan gusuku located near the shore of Irie Bay in southern Miyakojima, Okinawa, in former Ueno Village. It is the only castle on Miyako Island where the original castle layout is still visible.

History
The castle was built sometime prior to the 16th century. It was ruled by the Aji of Kubaka.

There is a legend that a merchant from Ryukyu named Tamagusuku fell in love with Koujin, daughter of the Lord of Kubaka Castle, and the two had a son. After returning from a trip, Tamagusuku overheard Koujin refer to him as an “exile” or “wanderer” while talking to their son. He told her that he was an important trader, then grabbed the boy and took him to Okinawa where he would grow up to be a Lord himself. Koujin then wandered on the shore near the castle praying for death, until one day a tsunami washed her away.

Gallery

References

Castles in Okinawa Prefecture